Norman Garwood (8 January 1946 – 13 April 2019) was an English production designer. He was best known for  his work being nominated for three Academy Awards in the category Best Art Direction.

Selected filmography
Garwood was nominated for three Academy Awards for Best Art Direction:
 Brazil (1985)
 Glory (1989)
 Hook (1991)

References

External links

1947 births
2019 deaths
British film designers
People from Birmingham, West Midlands
Best Production Design BAFTA Award winners